The following lists notable events that occurred during 1980 in Sri Lanka.

Incumbents
 President – J. R. Jayewardene
 Prime Minister – Ranasinghe Premadasa
 Chief Justice – Neville Samarakoon

Events
 Sri Lanka competed at the 1980 Summer Olympics in Moscow, USSR. From 1948 to 1972, the nation was known as Ceylon at the Olympic Games.

Births

 11 January – Mayantha Dissanayake, politician.
 13 January – Niru, musician.
 19 January – Michael Vandort, cricketer.
 1 February – Janaka Thissakuttiarachchi, politician.
 27 February – Harshana Rajakaruna, politician.
 25 March – Kasun Jayasuriya, footballer.
 6 April – Sameera Ekanayake, gymnast.
 17 April – Prasad Jayawardene, cricketer.
 30 May – Gihan Premachandra, cricketer.
 3 July – Dilhara Lokuhettige, cricketer.
 11 July – Indika Ruwanpura, cricketer.
 22 August – Charitha Buddhika, cricketer.
 4 October – Praba Udawatte, cricketer.
 5 October – Malintha Gajanayake, cricketer.
 24 October – Umayangana Wickramasinghe, actress.
 25 October – Prabath Nissanka, cricketer.
 31 October – Tharanath Basnayaka, politician.
 8 November – Mohamed Ramees, footballer.
 11 December – Nuwan Ekanayake, cricketer.
 16 December – Waruna Shantha, cricketer.
 Unknown date
 Ida Carmelitta, gang rape and murder victim.
 Mohanarajah Gajamohan, scientist.
 Suresh Sriskandarajah, militant.

Deaths
 1 March – R. A. Chandrasena, musician (b. 1924).
 12 April – Stanley de Silva, cricketer (b. 1956).
 20 April – M. Canagaratnam, politician (b. 1924).
 May – Edward Buultjens, cricketer (b. 1913).
 28 August – A. P. Jayasuriya, politician (b. 1897)
 1 September – Xavier Thaninayagam, academic (b. 1913).
 2 October – John Kotelawala, politician (b. 1895).
 4 December – Hamilton Shirley Amerasinghe, diplomat and civil servant (b. 1913).
 Unknown date
 Oliver Weerasinghe, architect and diplomat.

References

 
1980s in Sri Lanka
Sri Lanka
Sri Lanka
Years of the 20th century in Sri Lanka